K-60 is a  north–south state highway in Almena-District 4 Township, Norton County, Kansas, United States. K-60's southern terminus is at U.S. Route 36 (US‑36) east of Norton and the northern terminus is at K-383 south of Almena. The route was established around 1930.

Route description
The highway heads north, surrounded by a grassland terrain marked with several fields. The road  turns northwestward. After an intersection with Main Street, K-60 turns back northward towards Almena. The highway ends at an intersection with K-383 near the Kyle Railroad.

The route is maintained by the Kansas Department of Transportation (KDOT), which is responsible for constructing and maintaining highways in the state. As part of this role, KDOT regularly surveys traffic on their highways. These surveys are most often presented in the form of annual average daily traffic, which is the number of vehicles that use a highway during an average day of the year. In 2010, KDOT calculated that a total of 115 vehicles used the road daily, including 20 trucks. No part of the highway has been listed as part of the National Highway System, a network of roads important to the nation's defence, mobility, and economy.

History 
K-60 was built and established between 1927 and 1931 by the Kansas State Highway Commission, which was at the time responsible for maintaining highways in Kansas. At this time, the road was surfaced with gravel. The entire route was paved between 1948 and 1950. Since then, the road's designation has not been changed.

Major intersections

See also

 List of state highways in Kansas
 List of highways numbered 60

References

External links

060
Transportation in Norton County, Kansas